Mário Jorge Faria da Costa (born 15 November 1985 in Matosinhos) is a Portuguese former professional cyclist, who competed professionally between 2008 and 2010 and then again from 2013 to 2016. He was named in the startlist for the 2016 Vuelta a España.

Major results
2003
1st  Road race, National Junior Road Championships
2006
2nd Time trial, National Road Championships
2010
3rd Time trial, National Road Championships
2011
2nd Road race, National Road Championships
2015
1st  National Cyclo-cross Championships
2016
10th Overall Tour of Hainan

Grand Tour general classification results timeline

References

External links

 
 
 

1985 births
Living people
Portuguese male cyclists
Sportspeople from Porto District